This is the calendar for any Old Style common year starting on Friday, 25 March. The Old Style calendar ended the following March, on 24 March.
Examples: Julian year 1401, 1513 or 1614 (see bottom tables).

A common year is a year with 365 days, in other words, not a leap year, which has 366.

 Previous year (common)   Next year (common)
 Previous year (leap)     Next year (leap)

References

Julian calendar